

Births
28 November 1851 - Albert Grey, 4th Earl Grey, administrator, is born at St James's Palace
1852 - Philip Lyttleton Gell, 3rd Chairman of British South Africa Company
9 February 1853 - Leander Starr Jameson, statesman, is born at Stranraer, Scotland
3 December 1854 - William Henry Milton, sportsman and statesman, is born at Little Marlow, Buckinghamshire, England

See also
1840s in Zimbabwe
other events of 1850s
1860s in Zimbabwe
Years in Zimbabwe

References 

Decades in Zimbabwe
Zimbabwe